The Ladies Asian Golf Tour is a women's professional golf tour that was established as the Ladies Asia Golf Circuit in 1983 and known as the Kosaido Ladies Asia Golf Circuit 1987–2004 for sponsorship reasons. The tour was sanctioned by the Asia-Pacific Golf Confederation since its inception as an official Asian ladies' tour.

By 2005 there were five established women's professional tours in the world, of which two were in Asia, namely the LPGA of Japan Tour and the LPGA of Korea Tour. Japan and South Korea are two of the top three powers in women's professional golf, alongside the United States. The Ladies Asian Golf Tour is effectively a tour for the rest of Asia. This is comparable to the position in men's golf, where Japan has its own Japan Golf Tour and the rest of Asia has the Asian Tour. Most of the players on the tour come from Asia, but there are also representatives of various other parts of the world. Like the other major golf tours, LAGT is a professional member of the International Golf Federation.

1987–2003 the prize money was in the range of $50,000–70,000. The main sponsor, the Kosaido Company of Japan, terminated its sponsorship due to the passing away of its Chairman, Mr. Yoshiaki Sakurai in 2003. In 2005 the tour was reorganized as the Ladies Asian Tour, and the first event after the restart was the Phuket Thailand Ladies Masters, which was played on 15-17 December 2005 with a $100,000 purse. In 2006 there were five tournaments with combined prize money of US$410,000, and five again in 2007, with total prize money of US$590,000.

Tournaments of the Kosaido Ladies Asia Golf Circuit

1987 season

1988 season

1989 season

1990 season

1991 season

1992 season

1993 season

1994 season

1995 season

1996 season

1997 season

1998 season

1999 season

2000 season

2001 season

2002 season

2003 season

2004 season

Source:

Tournaments of the Ladies Asian Golf Tour

2005 season

2006 season

2007 season

2008 season

2009 season

2010 season

2011 season

2012 season

2013 season

2014 season

2015 season

2016 season

2017 season

2018 season

2019 season

2020 season

2021 season

2022 season

1Since 2017 LAGT has been allocated ten entries in the Hero Women's Indian Open

Order of Merit winners

Source:

See also
Asian Tour

References

External links

Professional golf tours
Women's golf
Recurring sporting events established in 1983
Golf in Asia
1983 establishments in Asia